The Tunisian Paralympic Committee, founded in 1990 and a member of the International Paralympic Committee (IPC), is responsible for the development and management of paralympic sports in Tunisia and it belongs to African Sports Confederation of Disabled.

Presidents
Mohamed Mzoughi

See also
Tunisia at the Paralympics

References

External links
 Official website 
 Home page at IPC web site

Tunisia
Tunisia at the Paralympics
Disability organisations based in Tunisia